The 2008 Super Fours was the seventh cricket Super Fours season. It took place from May to July and saw 4 teams compete in a 50 over league and a Twenty20 knockout tournament. Sapphires won the 50 over tournament, achieving their third 50 over title, whilst Rubies won the Twenty20 tournament, claiming their first title in the format.

Competition format
In the one day tournament, teams played each other twice in a round-robin format, with the winners of the group winning the tournament. Matches were played using a one day format with 50 overs per side.

The group worked on a points system with positions within the divisions being based on the total points. Points were awarded as follows:

Win: 15 points. 
Tie:  6 points. 
Loss: 0 points.
Bonus Points: Up to 5 points available to the winning team.

The Twenty20 competition consisted of two semi-finals, with the winners progressing to a Final and the losers playing in a third-place play-off.

Teams

50 over

Results

Source: ESPN Cricinfo

Twenty20

Semi-finals

Third-place play-off

Final

References

Super Fours